Henry C. Lea Elementary School is a historic elementary school located in the Walnut Hill neighborhood of Philadelphia, Pennsylvania. It is part of the School District of Philadelphia and was named after the publisher, civic activist and historian Henry Charles Lea. The building was designed by Henry deCourcy Richards and built by Cramp & Co. in 1914. It is a three-story, five bay, reinforced concrete building faced with brick and with terra cotta and granite trim in the Late Gothic Revival-style. It sits on a raised basement.  It features a Classical limestone center entrance surround, a central two-story bay window, decorative panels, crenelated parapet, and a projecting entrance bay.  It was used as an "observation school" for teacher education and training.

The building was added to the National Register of Historic Places in 1988 as the Henry C. Lea School of Practice.

References

External links

School buildings on the National Register of Historic Places in Philadelphia
Gothic Revival architecture in Pennsylvania
School buildings completed in 1914
West Philadelphia
School District of Philadelphia
Public K–8 schools in Philadelphia
1914 establishments in Pennsylvania